Larry Braziel (born September 25, 1954 in Fort Worth, Texas) is a retired American football player who played seven seasons in the National Football League

References

1954 births
Living people
American football cornerbacks
USC Trojans football players
Baltimore Colts players
Cleveland Browns players
Sportspeople from Fort Worth, Texas